The Halbic languages belong to the eastern branch of the Indo-Aryan languages and are mainly spoken in southern Chhattisgarh in India. They are transitional between Odia and Marathi. They include Halbi, Kamar,  Bhunjia and Nahari.

Eastern Indo-Aryan languages